A zero-defects mentality (also known as Zero Error Syndrome) exists when a command-and-control structure does not tolerate mistakes.  This atmosphere is now widely acknowledged to be ineffective in both military and corporate life.

The results of a zero-defects mentality can include careerism, reduced motivation and stifled innovation.  Soldiers or employees will feel neither empowered by their successes nor accountable for their failures.

Eliminating a zero-defects mentality is one of the primary goals of lean manufacturing, specifically through the application of Kaizen and Andon in the Toyota Production System.

See also
Zero defects
Zero tolerance (disambiguation), the civilian version

References

External links
Related article by Mary and Tom Poppendieck
End the Zero-defects Mentality

References

Military doctrines